This is a list of members of parliament appointed to represent the various constituencies of Ghana in 1965.

Composition
In 1964 a constitutional amendment was passed by the CPP majority in parliament to make the country a One-party state. All members of the 1965 parliament therefore belonged to one political party; the Convention People's Party. Additional constituencies were created compared to the previous parliament and 10 females were appointed to parliament by the President. All were members of the Convention Peoples Party.

List of MPs elected in the general election
The following table is a list of MPs elected in 1965, ordered by constituency.

See also
Parliament of Ghana
1964 Ghanaian constitutional referendum
1965 Ghanaian parliamentary election

References

External links and sources

African Elections Database

1965
Ghanaian MPs 1965–1966